Mehro Peelo, is a historical village of the Chakwal District, in Punjab, Pakistan, named after Baba Peelo, a famous poet hailing from Punjab. This village is also known as Sardar Harrar khan. The majority of people in the village belong to the Mughal Kassar tribe. Especially in the Mehro sub-tribe of Kasar, known as Churhial, a name given by CH Chourh Khan, a major landowner in Mehro. The Kasar Family directly belongs to Sardar Kassar Khan, a foreson of Amir Taimur Lang (Mongol Turk Emperor). In Peelo, the majority of people belong to the Qutab Shai Awan Family. Mehro Peelo includes watts in the union council Thaneel Kamal.

Mehro Peelo village is located about twenty-two kilometers from Chakwal city at Neela Dullah Road.

References

 Populated places in Chakwal District